Keith Jaure (born 2 March 1998) is a Zimbabwean cricketer. He made his Twenty20 debut for Zimbabwe in the 2017 Africa T20 Cup on 15 September 2017. He made his List A debut for Mashonaland Eagles in the 2018–19 Pro50 Championship on 12 December 2018. He made his first-class debut for Mashonaland Eagles in the 2018–19 Logan Cup on 4 February 2019.

In December 2020, he was selected to play for the Eagles in the 2020–21 Logan Cup.

References

External links
 

1998 births
Living people
Zimbabwean cricketers
Mashonaland Eagles cricketers
Place of birth missing (living people)